Seguenzia fulgida is a species of extremely small deep water sea snail, a marine gastropod mollusk in the family Seguenziidae.

Description
The height of the shell attains 6.1 mm which makes the shell higher than broad (4.4 mm)

Distribution
This marine species occurs off New Zealand in the Tasman Basin at a depth of about 1800 m.

References

External links
 To Encyclopedia of Life
 To World Register of Marine Species

fulgida
Gastropods described in 1983